"Towers of London" is a song written by Andy Partridge of the English rock band XTC, released as the second single from their 1980 album Black Sea. It peaked at number 31 on the UK Singles Chart. The BBC-2 documentary XTC at the Manor featured the group recording the song in the studio. Partridge later reflected that he may have been "subconsciously" trying to rewrite the Beatles' "Rain", desiring "clangorous guitars crashing together, and sort of droning." The night after John Lennon was killed, XTC played a gig at Liverpool, where they performed both "Towers of London" and "Rain" in tribute to the Beatle.

Charts

See also
 Beatlesque
 Tower of London

References

External links
 "Towers of London" on Chalkhills

XTC songs
1980 songs
1980 singles
Songs written by Andy Partridge
Virgin Records singles
Songs about London
Song recordings produced by Steve Lillywhite